Anthony Byrne (6 July 1930 – 27 April 2013), commonly known as Tony Byrne or Socks Byrne, was an amateur boxer.  Byrne won a bronze medal for Ireland at the 1956 Summer Olympics in Melbourne, Australia, in the lightweight division.

Early life and career
Byrne was born in Drogheda, Ireland.  Doubt had been cast over whether Byrne would have the funds to travel to Melbourne to participate in the 1956 Olympics. However, a fundraising campaign under the banner of "Send Byrne to Melbourne" was created, and it raised £653 from local businesses in Drogheda to send him on his quest for glory down under.

Melbourne Olympics
Byrne carried the flag for Ireland at the opening ceremony and was the captain of the Irish boxing team. He beat opponents from Czechoslovakia and United States before losing in the semifinal on a split decision to Harry Kurschat of Germany. A few months later, he showed what might have been when he beat the eventual Gold Medallist, Dick McTaggart, in an Ireland-England International at the Royal Albert Hall.

Olympic results 
1st round bye
Defeated Josef Chovanec (Czechoslovakia) points
Defeated Luis Molina (United States) points
Lost to Harry Kurschat (United Team of Germany) points

Life after boxing
In 1962, Byrne, and his wife Honor, emigrated to Canada. The Byrne's settled in Canada and have a family of two girls and a set of twin boys. In 2006 a statue of Byrne was unveiled in his hometown.

He died on 27 April 2013, aged 82.

See also
Ireland at the 1956 Summer Olympics
Boxing at the 1956 Summer Olympics

References

External links
 

Olympic boxers of Ireland
Olympic bronze medalists for Ireland
People from Drogheda
Irish emigrants to Canada
1930 births
Olympic medalists in boxing
Sportspeople from County Louth
2013 deaths
Irish male boxers
Medalists at the 1956 Summer Olympics
Boxers at the 1956 Summer Olympics
Lightweight boxers